Jacques II may refer to:

Jacques II of Cyprus (c. 1438/1439 or c. 1440 – 1473)
Jacques II de Chabannes (1470–1525) 
Potential regal name of Jacques, Hereditary Prince of Monaco